North Country is the third studio album by Canadian folk music group The Rankin Family. It was released by EMI on August 24, 1993. The album peaked at number 1 on the RPM Country Albums chart. A revised version was released in the United States in 1994. This version contained material from the original North Country album, 1992's Fare Thee Well Love and the Grey Dusk of Eve EP.

Track listing

Original release
"North Country" (Jimmy Rankin) - 3:36
"Oich U Agus H-Iuraibh Éile (Love Song)" (Traditional) - 3:01
"Borders and Time" (Jimmy Rankin) - 3:23
"Mull River Shuffle" (Donald Angus Beaton, J. S. Skinner, Jimmy Rankin, Wilfred Gillis) - 4:54
"Lisa Brown" (Jimmy Rankin) - 3:03
"Ho Ro Mo Nighean Donn Bhòidheach" (Traditional) - 4:41
"Tramp Miner" (Jimmy Rankin) - 3:18
"Rise Again" (Leon Dubinsky) - 3:47
"Leis An Lurgainn" (Traditional) - 3:04
"Christy Campbell Medley" (Traditional) - 4:40
"Saved in the Arms" (Jimmy Rankin) - 3:45
"Johnny Tulloch: Betty Lou's Reel" (Beaton, Jimmy Rankin) - 3:02
"Turn That Boat Around" (Jimmy Rankin) - 3:33

Personnel (Musicians)
Rankin Family  - Primary Artist
Scott Alexander -  Bass
Claude Desjardins - Synthesizer, Percussion
Michael Francis  - Acoustic Guitar, Dobro, Mandolin, Electric Guitar, Mandola
Brian Leonard -  Percussion, Drums
Boko Suzuki  - Synthesizer
Tom Szczesniak  - Bass, Accordion
Dave MacIsaac -  Acoustic Guitar
Howie MacDonald -  Fiddle, Piano
John Morris Rankin -  Fiddle, Piano
Steve Smith  - Pedal Steel Guitar
Cookie Rankin -  Vocals, Background Vocals
Heather Rankin - Vocals, Background Vocals
Jimmy Rankin -  Acoustic Guitar, Vocals, Background Vocals, Snare Drums
Raylene Rankin  - Vocals, Background Vocals
Ray Parker  - Organ, Synthesizer

Revised release
"North Country" (Jimmy Rankin) – 3:35
"Borders and Time" (Jimmy Rankin) – 3:23
"Orangedale Whistle" (Jimmy Rankin) – 3:25
"Ho Ro Mo Nighean Down Bhóidheach" (Traditional) – 4:41
"Gillis Mountain" (Raylene Rankin) – 3:04
"Fare Thee Well Love" (Jimmy Rankin) – 4:29
"Christy Campbell Medley" (John Morris Rankin, Traditional) – 3:05
"Tramp Miner" (Jimmy Rankin) – 3:18
"Rise Again" (Leon Dubinsky) – 3:47
"Grey Dusk of Eve" (Dave Field, The Rankin Family) – 3:07
"Fisherman's Son" (Jimmy Rankin) – 3:30
"Tell My Ma" (Traditional) – 2:15
"Turn That Boat Around" (Jimmy Rankin) – 3:33

Chart performance

References

1993 albums
The Rankin Family albums
EMI Records albums